Mqanduli is a town in OR Tambo District Municipality in the Eastern Cape province of South Africa.

Village 30 km south of Mthatha and 22 km north-east of Elliotdale. Named after a nearby hill; of Xhosa origin, the name is said to mean 'grindstone-maker', after a person living there.

References

Populated places in the King Sabata Dalindyebo Local Municipality